Mynachlog-ddu is a village, parish and community in the Preseli Hills, Pembrokeshire, Wales. The community includes the parish of Llangolman.

Origin of the name
The Welsh placename means "black monastic grange": before the Dissolution of the Monasteries, the parish belonged to St Dogmaels Abbey.

Geography

History
Mynachlog-ddu and the surrounding Preselis are rich in prehistoric remains. It is one of the possible sites of the Battle of Mynydd Carn in 1081. By c.1100 it was under the control of the Normans. Much has been unenclosed moorland since the Middle Ages, with few houses. The village developed as housing for slate quarry workers and there has been a chapel in the village since 1794.

The population of the parish in 1821 was 447.

Carn Menyn is presumed to be the source of the bluestones used in the inner circle of Stonehenge. In 2000/2001 a project was established to try to transport a piece of bluestone from the village to Stonehenge. The project ended when the stone sank in the sea. It was lifted out a few months after, but the project was never resumed. A comedy based on the idea of a campaign to have the bluestones returned Bringing Back the Bluestones premiered in Pembrokeshire.

There are six listed structures in the community.

Worship
There are two places of worship in the village: the Anglican church (Church in Wales) of St Dogfael (sometimes, Dogmael), and Bethel, the Baptist meeting house.

Notable people
 The poet Waldo Williams (1904–1971) was a pupil at the primary school (where his father was headteacher) between 1911 and 1915, where he learned to speak Welsh. There is a memorial to him at nearby Rhos Fach.
 Dutch naval officer and Colditz prisoner of war camp escapee Damiaen Joan van Doorninck (1902–1987) spent his retirement in Mynachlogddu and died there.

References

External links

Further historical information and sources on Genuki
Photos of Mynachlog-Ddu and surrounding area on geograph.org.uk

Villages in Pembrokeshire
Communities in Pembrokeshire